Garra wanae is a species of ray-finned fish in the genus Garra which is found in Balochistan.

References 

Garra
Fish described in 1914